Gedewon Makonnen, called Gedewon (1939–1995), was an Ethiopian artist.

Born in Begemder, Gedewon trained as a cleric in the Ethiopian Orthodox Church.  As part of his training, he learned to draw talismans, which soon became much sought-after among Western collectors.  Some of his drawings are now in The Contemporary African Art Collection (CAAC) of Jean Pigozzi.   He died in Därtähal in 1995.

Exhibitions
2005 Arts of Africa, Grimaldi Forum, Monaco, France
2005 African Art Now : Masterpieces from the Jean Pigozzi Collection, Museum of Fine Art Houston, USA
2003 – 2004 Vernacular Visionaries: International Outsider Art in Context, Museum of International Folk Art, Santa Fe, New Mexico, USA
2002 Art that Heals, Apex Art, New York, USA
2001 Dessins Choisis, Forum Culturel de Blanc-Mesnil, Le Blanc-Mesnil, France
2001 Working in the Spirit : Gedewon and Vyakul, Cavin-Morris Gallery, New York, USA
2000 Partage d’Exotismes, La Halle Tony Garnier, Lyon, France
1998 Africa, Africa : A vibrant Art from a Dynamic Continent, Tobu Museum of Art, Tokyo, Japan

References
Biographical sketch
The Contemporary African Art Collection

1939 births
1995 deaths
Ethiopian artists